Sujan Singh Bundela is an Indian politician.  He was elected to the Lok Sabha, the lower house of the Parliament of India from Jhansi, Uttar Pradesh  as a member of the Indian National Congress.

References

External links
Official biographical sketch in Parliament of India website

Lok Sabha members from Uttar Pradesh
India MPs 1984–1989
India MPs 1999–2004
Indian National Congress politicians from Uttar Pradesh
1946 births
Living people